Vishnu Sakharam Khandekar (11 January 1898 – 2 September 1976) was a Marathi writer from Maharashtra, India. He was the first Marathi author to win the prestigious Jnanpith Award.

Early life
Khandekar was born on 11 January 1898 in Sangli, Maharashtra. His father was a munsif (a subordinate official) in Sangli principality where he spent his childhood and completed his early education. In his early life, he was interested in acting in movies and staged various dramas during school days.

After passing his matriculation exam in 1913, Khandekar joined Fergusson College, Pune. In 1920, he started working as a school teacher at a school in Shiroda

Professional and literary life
Khandekar's writing career began in 1919 when Shrimat Kalipuranam, his first work, was published, and continued to 1974 when his novel Yayati was published.

In 1920, Khandekar started working as a school teacher in a small town, Shiroda, in the present-day Sindhudurg district of the Konkan region in Maharashtra. He worked in that school until 1938. While working as a teacher, Khandekar produced in his spare time abundant Marathi literature in various forms. In his lifetime, he wrote sixteen novels, six plays, around 250 short stories, 50 allegorical stories, 100 essays, and over 200 critiques.
He worked and founded Khandekari alankar in Marathi grammar.

Honors and awards
In 1941, Khandekar was elected as the president of the annual Marathi Sahitya Sammelan (Marathi Literary Conference) in Solapur. In 1968, the Government of India honoured him with a Padma Bhushan award in recognition of his literary accomplishments. Two years later, he was also honoured with the Sahitya Akademi Fellowship of the Indian Sahitya Akademi. in 1974, he was awarded Jnanpith Award, country's highest literary recognition, for his novel Yayati. Shivaji University at Kolhapur, Maharashtra conferred on him an honorary degree of D.Litt. In 1998, the Government of India issued a commemorative postage stamp in his honour.

Major works
Khandekar's novel Yayāti (ययाति) received three prestigious awards: A Maharashtra State Award (1960), a Sahitya Akademi Award (1960), and a Jnanpith Award (1974).

Khandekar's other novels are as follows:

Hrudayāchi Hāk (हृदयाची हाक) (1930)
Kānchan Mruga (कांचनमृग) (1931)
Ulkā (उल्का) (1934)
Don Mane (दोन मने) (1938)
Hirwā Chāphā (हिरवा चाफ़ा) (1938)
Don Dhruwa (दोन धृव) (1934)
Rikāmā Dewhārā (रिकामा देव्हारा) (1939)
Pahile Prem (पहिले प्रेम) (1940)
Kraunchawadh (क्रौंचवध) (1942)
Jalalelā Mohar (जळलेला मोहर) (1947)
Pāndhare Dhag (पांढरे ढग) (1949)
Amrutawel (अमृतवेल)
Sukhāchā Shodh (सुखाचा शोध)
Ashru (अश्रू))
Soneri Swapne Bhangaleli (सोनेरी स्वप्ने भंगलेली)
Yayati (ययाति)
Eka Panachi Kahani (एका पानाची कहाणी)  (Autobiography)

Other works
The following is a partial list of Khandekar's other works:

अभिषेक(Abhishek)
अविनाश (Avinash)
गोकर्णीची फुले (Gokarnichi Fule)
ढगाआडचे चांदणे (Dhagaadache Chandne)
दवबिंदू (Davabindu)
नवी स्त्री (Navi Stree)
प्रसाद (Prasad)
मुखवटे (Mukhawate)
रानफुले (Ranfule)
विकसन (Vikasan)
क्षितिजस्पर्श (Kshitijsparsh)

Movies and television serials
Several movies and television serials have been made based on the works of Khandekar. The movies include:
Chhāyā...........[Marathi] (1936)
Jwālā..............[Marathi and Hindi] (1938)
Devatā............[Marathi] (1939)
Amrut..............[Marathi and Hindi] (1941)
Dharma Patni...[Telugu and Tamil] (1941)
Pardeshi.........[Marathi]) (1953)

Khandekar wrote the dialogue and screenplay for the Marathi movie Lagna Pahāwe Karoon (1940).

Other works

Bibliography
 Yayati (Marathi). 1959. .

Works in translation
 Yayati by V. S. Khandekar (English), Tr. by Y. P. Kulkarni. Orient Paperbacks. .

See also
 List of Indian writers

References

External links
 
 Vishnu Sakharam Khandekar, profile

Presidents of the Akhil Bharatiya Marathi Sahitya Sammelan
Marathi-language writers
Marathi people
Indian male novelists
People from Sangli
1898 births
1976 deaths
Recipients of the Sahitya Akademi Award in Marathi
Recipients of the Padma Bhushan in literature & education
Recipients of the Jnanpith Award
Recipients of the Sahitya Akademi Fellowship
20th-century Indian poets
20th-century Indian novelists
Indian male poets
Poets from Maharashtra
Novelists from Maharashtra
20th-century Indian male writers